Grumpy is a 1923 American silent comedy drama film distributed by Paramount Pictures. It is based on a 1913 Broadway play Grumpy by Horace Hodges and Thomas Wigney Percyval and starred English actor Cyril Maude. The director of this film is William C. deMille, brother of Cecil, and the star is Theodore Roberts. This film was remade by Paramount as an early sound film for Cyril Maude reprising his Broadway role. This silent version was thought to be long lost but a copy has been discovered in the Gosfilmofond Archive in Moscow, Russia.

Plot
As described in a film magazine review, Ernest Heron wants to marry Virginia Bullivant, the daughter of retired lawyer Grumpy. Ernest is entrusted with a valuable diamond to bring to his firm in London. Chamberlin Jarvis, a crook and rival for the hand of the young woman, hears of the trip. After much intrigue, Jarvis obtains the diamond but, through the evidence of a gardenia, he is exposed and caught. Ernest and Virginia end up together.

Cast

References

External links

1923 films
American silent feature films
American films based on plays
Films directed by William C. deMille
American black-and-white films
1920s rediscovered films
1923 comedy-drama films
Rediscovered American films
1920s American films
Silent American comedy-drama films
1920s English-language films